Chemist is the ninth album by Australian improvised music trio The Necks, which was first released on the Fish of Milk label in 2006 and later on the ReR label, internationally. The album's three tracks, "Fatal", "Buoyant" and "Abillera", were written, performed and produced by the group's members: Chris Abrahams on piano, Lloyd Swanton on double bass and Tony Buck on drums and guitar. It won the ARIA Music Awards Best Jazz Album category in 2006.

Reception 

AllMusic's François Couture rated the album at four-and-a-half-out-of-five stars and explained, "Throughout the album, despite all the different approaches and new elements, the music remains resolutely, unmistakably the Necks... [it] is the trio's best album since Aether (or, if you don't like their softer side, since Hanging Gardens), an essential for the fan, and a must-have for the casual listener." John L Waters of The Guardian rated it at four-out-of-five stars, "[it] breaks with Necks tradition by featuring three 20-minute pieces, each with different moods and soundworlds. There's the spooky, Miles-ish 'Buoyant'; the dense ambient indie of 'Abillera'; and the dark, rolling groove of 'Fatal', which seems to cry out for a David Lynch video to accompany it."

Track listing 

All compositions by the Necks' Chris Abrahams, Tony Buck and Lloyd Swanton.
 "Fatal" – 21:09
 "Buoyant" – 19:48
 "Abillera" – 19:51

Personnel 

 Chris Abrahams – piano
 Tony Buck – drums, guitar
 Lloyd Swanton – bass

References 

2005 albums
ARIA Award-winning albums
Jazz albums by Australian artists
The Necks albums